"Hō-Ren-Sō" (報・連・相) is a business mantra or mnemonic acronym in Japanese business culture. It is an "abbreviation of "Hōkoku" (報告, to report), "Renraku" (連絡, to inform) and "Sōdan" (相談, to consult), and is more memorable as a homonym of hōrensō, the Japanese word for "spinach". It is utilised as a basic business rule in Japan to conduct smooth business communication. The origin of "Ho-Ren-So" comes from Tomiji Yamazaki who was the ex-president of Yamatana Security firm. In 1982 he started using the term for effective business communication in his firm and it has been widely spread and used throughout Japan through his book, "Strengthen your company with Ho-Ren-So".

Description
"Hokoku" is to report on a process or result of business, from a subordinate to a superior. In Japan, subordinates don't have much authority to make business decisions. Usually the decisions are made by an organisation as a whole. Therefore, a subordinate must report everything to their superiors immediately and exactly. It is especially important to report a mistake or a problem immediately because his superior has the responsibility for it.

"Renraku" is to inform and notify of facts. One must inform the facts and decisions to the relevant parties. One should not include one's opinion and guesses. If "Renraku" is not done or not completed, then it is not possible to control a team. And then, "Renraku" should be communicated to the people who need it. Finally, "Renraku" must be done quickly, as its contents might be needed to prepare for the next action.

"Sodan" is to consult or discuss. For example, a superior gives advice to a subordinate, and an employee talks over with his superior about some unnecessary consultation in Japanese business. In Japanese companies, superiors rarely speak to their subordinates, but they actually do want to be asked for their advice or opinion. They want others to think that they can be relied upon, so they feel better if they receive requests for consultation from their subordinates.

Pros and cons

There are many benefits to incorporating the "Ho-Ren-So" philosophy. First, if an issue within tasks is reported, it can be resolved quickly because a manager controls it and decides how to resolve it. Next, if information is communicated with team members and it is known to all members of a team, they can take ownership of the schedule and tasks. Finally, if a subordinate proactively asks for information, a decrease of quality will be prevented and likely won't occur again.

On the other hand, there are some Cons in "Ho-Ren-So". First, there are management costs. It is a very time-consuming process, leaving employees with little time to complete their various work assignments. Moreover, and since a subordinate must always wait for instructions from his supervisor, this prevents employees from applying their problem-solving skills on their own, and initiative is prevented by the constant need for managerial input.

References

Japanese business terms
Mantras
Mnemonics